The 2011 Big Ten Conference men's soccer season was the 21st season of men's varsity soccer in the conference. Northwestern won both the regular season and the Big Ten Tournament.

Preseason 
Indiana was picked to be the winner of the regular season.

Preseason poll

Teams

Stadia and locations 

 Illinois, Iowa, Minnesota, Nebraska and Purdue do not sponsor men's soccer

Personnel

Regular season

Results

Postseason

Big Ten Tournament

NCAA Tournament

Statistics

See also 

 Big Ten Conference
 2011 Big Ten Conference Men's Soccer Tournament
 2011 NCAA Division I men's soccer season
 2011 in American soccer

References 

 
2011 NCAA Division I men's soccer season
2011